Punchy may refer to:

Punchy, Hawaiian Punch's mascot
Dementia pugilistica, a neurological disorder which affects some boxers, also called punch-drunk syndrome
Punchy, Somme, a French commune
Punchy, a nickname for the town of Punchbowl, New South Wales, Australia
Punchy, a video game based on Punch and Judy